Newill is a surname. Notable people with the surname include:

 Edward Newill (1877–1954), Archdeacon of Dorking, England
 James Newill (1911–1975), American actor and singer
 Mary J. Newill (1860–1947), English painter, embroiderer, etc.

See also
 Newall (disambiguation)
 Newell (disambiguation)